USS Everett (PG-116/PF-8), a  patrol frigate in commission from 1944 to 1945 and from 1950 to 1953, thus far has been the only ship of the United States Navy to be named for Everett, Washington. She also served in the Soviet Navy as EK-15 and in the Japan Maritime Self-Defense Force as JDS Kiri (PF-11/PF-291/YAC-20).

Construction and commissioning
Originally classified as a patrol gunboat, PG-116, Everett was reclassified as a patrol frigate, PF-8, on 15 April 1943. She was laid down under a Maritime Commission (MARCOM) contract, MC hull 1426, at the Permanente Metals Richmond Shipyard #4, Richmond, California. Everett was launched on 29 September 1943, sponsored by Mrs. Cornelia M. Fitch, and was commissioned on 22 January 1944.

Service history

U.S. Navy, World War II, 1944–1945
After shakedown and training, Everett steamed north to Adak, Territory of Alaska, arriving there on 22 April 1944, and began 16 months of patrol and escort duty in the Aleutian Islands. Selected for transfer to the Soviet Navy in Project Hula – a secret program for the transfer of U.S. Navy ships to the Soviet Navy at Cold Bay, Alaska, in anticipation of the Soviet Union joining the war against Japan – she then proceeded to Cold Bay in the summer of 1945 and began training her new Soviet crew.

Soviet Navy, 1945–1949

Commissioned into the Soviet Navy immediately, Everett was designated as a storozhevoi korabl ("escort ship") and renamed EK-15 in Soviet service. She soon departed Cold Bay bound for Petropavlovsk-Kamchatsky in the Soviet Union, where she served as a patrol vessel in the Soviet Far East.

In February 1946, the United States began negotiations for the return of ships loaned to the Soviet Union for use during World War II. On 8 May 1947, United States Secretary of the Navy James V. Forrestal informed the United States Department of State that the United States Department of the Navy wanted 480 of the 585 combatant ships it had transferred to the Soviet Union for World War II use returned, EK-15 among them. Negotiations for the return of the ships were protracted, but on 15 November 1949 the Soviet Union finally returned EK-15 to the U.S. Navy at Yokosuka, Japan.

U.S. Navy, Korean War, 1950–1953
Reverting to her original name, Everett was given an extensive overhaul at Yokosuka, where she was recommissioned on 26 July 1950, for service during the Korean War. Assigned to primary duty as station ship at Hong Kong, she also joined the United Nations Blockading and Escort Force in operations off both coasts of Korea. On 3 July 1951, while bombarding Wonsan, North Korea, Everett was hit by fire from a shore battery; one man was killed and seven were wounded, but damage to the ship was light.

Japan Maritime Self-Defense Force, 1953–1976

Kiri was redesignated PF-291 on 1 September 1957. The United States struck her from the Navy List on 1 December 1961. She was reclassified as an "auxiliary stock craft" (YAC) and renamed YAC-20 on 31 March 1970. Decommissioned on 1 October 1975, she was returned to the United States on 22 January 1976 for disposal and subsequently scrapped.

Awards
The US Navy awarded Everett four battle stars for her Korean War service.

Notes

References

Bibliography

External links 
 
hazegray.org: USS Everett

 

Tacoma-class frigates
Ships built in Richmond, California
1943 ships
World War II frigates and destroyer escorts of the United States
Everett, Washington
Tacoma-class frigates of the Soviet Navy
World War II frigates of the Soviet Union
Cold War frigates of the Soviet Union
Cold War frigates and destroyer escorts of the United States
Korean War frigates and destroyer escorts of the United States
Tacoma-class frigates of the Japan Maritime Self-Defense Force
Ships transferred under Project Hula